Double Dealing is a 1932 British comedy film directed by Leslie S. Hiscott and starring Richard Cooper, Frank Pettingell and Sydney Fairbrother. It was made as a quota quickie at Twickenham Studios.

Cast
 Frank Pettingell as Rufus Moon 
 Richard Cooper as Toby Traill
 Sydney Fairbrother as Sarah Moon
 Zoe Palmer as Dolly Simms
 Jill Hands as Betty
 Betty Astell as Flossie 
 Aileen Despard as Rosie
 Gladys Hamer as Clara

References

Bibliography
 Low, Rachael. Filmmaking in 1930s Britain. George Allen & Unwin, 1985.
 Wood, Linda. British Films, 1927-1939. British Film Institute, 1986.

External links
 

1932 films
1932 comedy films
British comedy films
1930s English-language films
Films directed by Leslie S. Hiscott
Films shot at Twickenham Film Studios
Quota quickies
British black-and-white films
1930s British films